Leonardo Bia (born 23 January 2002) is an Italian footballer who plays as a right-back for Luparense.

Club career
He was raised in the youth system of Cremonese. He was first called up to the senior squad in January 2020 for a Coppa Italia game against Lazio, but was not used.

He made his Serie B debut for Cremonese on 22 December 2020 in a game against Pordenone. He substituted Marco Pinato in the 86th minute of a 2–1 away victory.

On 20 July 2021 he joined to Serie C club Lecco.

On 21 July 2022, Bia moved to Serie D club Luparense.

References

External links
 

2002 births
Living people
Sportspeople from Cremona
Footballers from Lombardy
Italian footballers
Association football defenders
Serie B players
Serie D players
U.S. Cremonese players
Calcio Lecco 1912 players
A.C. Crema 1908 players